Gibbs or GIBBS is a surname and acronym. It may refer to:

People
 Gibbs (surname)

Places
 Gibbs (crater), on the Moon
 Gibbs, Missouri, US
 Gibbs, Tennessee, US
 Gibbs Island (South Shetland Islands), Antarctica
 2937 Gibbs, an asteroid

Science

Mathematics and statistics
 Gibbs phenomenon
 Gibbs' inequality
 Gibbs sampling

Physics
 Gibbs phase rule
 Gibbs free energy
 Gibbs entropy
 Gibbs paradox
 Gibbs–Helmholtz equation
 Gibbs algorithm
 Gibbs state
 Gibbs-Marangoni effect
 Gibbs phenomenon, an MRI artifact

Organisations
 Gibbs & Cox naval architecture firm
 Gothenburg International Bioscience Business School
 Gibbs College, several US locations
 Gibbs Technologies, developer and manufacturer of amphibious vehicles
 Gibbs High School (disambiguation), several schools of this name exist
 Antony Gibbs & Sons, British trading company, established in London in 1802

Other uses
 Gibbs SR, former name of the toothpaste Mentadent
 Gibbs Stadium, Spartanburg, South Carolina, US

See also

 
 
 Gibbs' Reflective Cycle
 List of things named after Josiah W. Gibbs
 Gibbes (disambiguation)
 Gibb (disambiguation)
 Gib (disambiguation)
 Gipps (disambiguation)